Derek Suddons (born October 6, 1978) is a  professional lacrosse player who most recently played for the New England Black Wolves of the National Lacrosse League and the Brooklin Redmen of Major Series Lacrosse. A member of the 1997 and 1999 Minto Cup winning Whitby Warriors club, Suddons played lacrosse collegiality for the University of Hartford Hawks. He was drafted by the Columbus Landsharks in the first round of the 2001 NLL Entry Draft, and has since enjoyed a lengthy career in the NLL.

Suddons began his NLL career in the 2001 with the beleaguered Columbus Landsharks. When the Landsharks moved to Phoenix, Arizona, becoming the Arizona Sting, Suddons opted to sign with the Toronto Rock so that he could be closer to his Whitby, Ontario hometown. Suddons won the 2005 championship with the Rock, and played with the club until early in the 2009 NLL season, when he was traded, along with Ryan Benesch, to the Edmonton Rush. His four years with the Rush were capped with a loss in the 2012 Champions Cup match against the Rochester Knighthawks, at which point Suddons once again chose to go back east, signing with the Buffalo Bandits. He signed with the New England Black Wolves prior to the 2016 season.

Statistics

NLL
Reference:

References

External links
NLL stats at pointstreak.com
MSL stats at poinstreak.com

1978 births
Living people
Canadian lacrosse players
Lacrosse people from Ontario
Sportspeople from Whitby, Ontario
Hartford Hawks men's lacrosse players
Buffalo Bandits players
Columbus Landsharks players
Edmonton Rush players
Toronto Rock players
Place of birth missing (living people)
New England Black Wolves players
Canadian expatriate sportspeople in the United States